The 2021–22 Kentucky Wildcats men's basketball team represented the University of Kentucky in the 2021–22 NCAA Division I men's basketball season. The Wildcats, founding members of the Southeastern Conference, played their home games at Rupp Arena and were led by John Calipari in his 13th season as head coach. The Wildcats finished the season 26–8, 14–4 in SEC play to finish a tie for second place. As the No. 3 seed in the SEC tournament, they defeated Vanderbilt in the quarterfinals before losing to Tennessee in the semifinals. They received an at large bid to the NCAA tournament as the No. 2 seed in the East region. The Wildcats  became just the 10th No. 2 seed to lose in the First Round of the NCAA Tournament, losing to No. 15-seeded (and eventual regional runner-up) Saint Peter’s 85–79 in overtime. It also marked the first time Kentucky had suffered a First Round exit under Calipari, and allowed eventual tournament champion Kansas to take the all-time record for most wins in Division I men's college basketball history.

Previous season
In a season disrupted by the ongoing COVID-19 pandemic restrictions, the Wildcats finished the 2020–21 season a disappointing 9–16, 8–9 in SEC play to finish in eighth place. They lost in the second round of the SEC tournament to Mississippi State.

Offseason

Coaching changes

Departures

Additions to staff

Player departures
Note that all players in the 2020–21 season, regardless of their classification, had the option to return to the program. Due to COVID-19 impacts, the NCAA declared that the 2020–21 season would not count against the athletic eligibility of any student-athlete in any of the organization's winter sports, including basketball. This led the NBA and its players union to agree that for the 2021 draft only, players who were seniors in 2020–21 had to declare their eligibility for the draft.

2021 recruiting class
On October 26, 2020, Bryce Hopkins committed to UK over offers from Louisville and Wisconsin. Hopkins was the first commitment in the 2021 recruiting class and the No. 9 ranked power forward in the 2021 class by 247Sports. He was a consensus four-star player by the four main recruiting services and was ranked No. 38 overall by 247Sports.
 
On October 31, 2020, Daimion Collins committed to UK over offers from Alabama and Oklahoma. Collins was the second commitment in the 2021 recruiting class and the No. 2 ranked power forward in the 2021 class by 247Sports. He was a consensus five-star player by the four main recruiting services and was ranked No. 10 overall by 247Sports.
 
On May 12, 2021, TyTy Washington committed to UK over offers from Arizona, Baylor, Kansas, LSU and Oregon. Washington was the third commitment in the 2021 recruiting class and the No. 1 ranked point guard in the 2021 class by 247Sports. He was a consensus five-star player by the four main recruiting services and was ranked No. 11 overall by 247Sports.

2022 recruiting class
On November 10, 2021, four consensus five-star prospects signed with UK: Skyy Clark, Chris Livingston, Shaedon Sharpe, and Cason Wallace. Clark planned to enroll at UK in the spring 2022 semester, while the others planned to arrive in fall 2022. On March 6, 2022 Clark announced that he would not be attending Kentucky. Kentucky released Clark from his letter of intent, freeing Clark to attend a new school.

2023 recruiting class
On November 20, 2021, Reed Sheppard verbally committed to UK over multiple offers, with Louisville and Virginia among the most active in attempting to recruit him. The son of former UK basketball players Jeff Sheppard and the former Stacey Reed, he was the first commitment to the 2023 recruiting class. At the time of his commitment, he was the No. 3 ranked combo guard in the 2023 class by 247 Sports.

Incoming transfers

Roster

Schedule and results

|-
!colspan=12 style=| Exhibition

|-
!colspan=12 style=| Regular season

|-
!colspan=12 style=| SEC Tournament

|-
!colspan=12 style=| NCAA tournament

Rankings

See also
2021–22 Kentucky Wildcats women's basketball team

References

Kentucky Wildcats men's basketball seasons
Kentucky
Kentucky basketball, men, 2021-22
Kentucky basketball, men, 2021-22
Kentucky